Mickey Muennig (née George Kaye Muennig; 1935–2021) was an American architect. He was known for this organic architecture in Big Sur, along the California coast.

Early life and education 
George Kaye Muennig was born on April 20, 1935 in Joplin, Jasper County, Missouri. He got his nickname Mickey, by his older sister, due to his outward semblance with Mickey Mouse. 

He began his college education at Georgia Institute of Technology, hoping to study aeronautical engineering. After his first year of college he decided to transfer to the University of Oklahoma to study architecture under Bruce Goff, and Herb Greene.

Career 

After graduation he had apprenticeships in New Orleans, Louisiana and Long Beach, Mississippi. In 1969, he moved to Denver for an architecture job that did not materialize and his family stayed in Denver until 1971. 

In 1971, Muenning went to a two week Gestalt therapy class in the Big Sur at Esalen Institute, he described it as an enlightening experience and decide to stay a week longer. He was able to blend his architectural design with the local materials, and create homes that felt like they were a part of Big Sur. He was a proponent of underground houses for both temperature control and fire proofing, as well as building on stilts. Many of his works have been described as "magical", "creative", or "visionary". Some of the houses had issues with livability according to Edward Bazinet, a client of Muenning's, as he had failed to plan for the need of furniture.

The Post Ranch Inn, a luxury resort in Big Sur opened in April 1991. Muenning's design work for the Post Ranch Inn featured buildings with geometric inspiration by animals (such as the butterfly), as well as towers and cylinders that are a nod to Bruce Goff. The guest rooms were arranged in a village, made of individual small structures. The hotel design was meant to not compete with the landscape, the hotel is located on a dramatic coastal bluff and had views of migrating whales in the Pacific Ocean. 

In 2000 and 2002, Architectural Digest had listed Muenning as one of the top 100 architects in the United States. In 2005, the Monterey chapter of the American Institute of Architects (AIA) honored Muennig.

Death and legacy 
Muennig died on June 10, 2021 at the age of 86 in Big Sur. The Muennig archives are held at the University of Oklahoma, American School of Architecture Archive.

Select works

See also 
 Big Sur Coast Highway
 Lloyd Kahn

References

Further reading 
 
 
 

1935 births
2021 deaths
People from Joplin, Missouri
University of Oklahoma alumni
Architects from California
Organic architecture
People from Big Sur, California